Quapaw Quarter United Methodist Church, formerly the Winfield Methodist Church  is a historic church at 1601 Louisiana Street in Little Rock, Arkansas.  It is a two-story brick building with Gothic Revival style, designed by the prominent architectural firm of Thompson and Harding, and built in 1921.  Its main facade has three entrances below a large Gothic-arch stained glass window, all framed by cream-colored terra cotta elements.  A square tower rises above the center of the transept.

The church was listed on the National Register of Historic Places in 1982.

See also
National Register of Historic Places listings in Little Rock, Arkansas

References

Methodist churches in Arkansas
Churches on the National Register of Historic Places in Arkansas
Gothic Revival church buildings in Arkansas
Churches completed in 1921
Churches in Little Rock, Arkansas
National Register of Historic Places in Little Rock, Arkansas
Historic district contributing properties in Arkansas